Mai Nguyen (born 16 June 1990) is an Australian rules footballer who played for the Greater Western Sydney Giants in the AFL Women's competition. Nguyen was drafted by Greater Western Sydney with their seventh selection and forty-ninth overall in the 2016 AFL Women's draft. She played three matches in her debut season, which ended early due to a ruptured ACL. She was delisted at the end of the 2017 season.

References

External links 

1990 births
Living people
Greater Western Sydney Giants (AFLW) players
Australian rules footballers from New South Wales